Vārnukrogs  is a residential area and neighbourhood of the city Jūrmala, Latvia.

References

External links 

Neighbourhoods in Jūrmala